SGIS may refer to:
Shaoguan Iron and Steel, a Chinese iron and steel manufacturing company
Specialist Group Information Services, a unit of the British Army